The Offer Wadham Lighthouse is an active lighthouse in Newfoundland and Labrador, Canada, was lit for the first time on October 4, 1858. It was built after many petitions were sent to the government arguing for a light to be put on the island to help guide mariners. This arose especially after the "Spring of the Wadhams" in 1852, when more than 40 sealing vessels were crushed and abandoned in the ice near Offer Wadham Island and several crew members escaped by climbing over cliffs to find shelter.

Keepers 
The first lighthouse keeper was Thomas Hennessey and his assistant was Edward Reddy. Charles Prowse was appointed keeper in November 1862 until 1901 and his assistants were William Hennessey, William Murphy, Peter Woods, and Robert Wellon. Other lighthouse keepers on the island were:

 Thomas Hennessey 1857–1863
 Charles Prowse 1863–1899
 Elias Abbott 1899–1904
 Stephen Abbot 1905–1908
 William Pomeroy 1909–1916
 James Ford Mouland 1916–1936
 Arch Way, Walter Hicks at least 1941–at least 194)

Description 
The lighthouse is described in the Newfoundland Almanac as a steady, fixed, white 4th order dioptric burning on a circular brick tower at an arc of 360 degrees with a 2 wick concentric lamp.

See also 
 List of lighthouses in Newfoundland and Labrador
 List of lighthouses in Canada

References

External links 
 
 Aids to Navigation Canadian Coast Guard
 Picture of Offer Wadham Lighthouse

Lighthouses completed in 1858
Lighthouses in Newfoundland and Labrador